Uli Weber (born 1964) is a photographer best known for his celebrity portraits. He received an IPA Award in 2016, Communication Arts 'Best Photo Book' in 2015 & Hasselblad Masters Award in 2006.

Biography 
Weber is a portrait and fashion photographer, based in London. He was born in Ulm, West Germany in 1964 and studied photography at Istituto Europeo di Design and Istituto Superiore di Fotografia in Rome from 1984 to 1986. He moved to London in 1986.

Weber has worked for notable publications such as The Times Magazine, Tatler, Elle, Vogue and Mixmag amongst others. He has photographed a number of celebrities including Sting, Kylie Minogue, Daniel Radcliffe, Damian Lewis, Stephen Fry, Helena Bonham Carter, Zara Phillips, Mark Strong and many more. He has also worked for clients such as Ferrari, Liberty, Jack Wolfskin, Audi, Marks and Spencers and many more.

His first published book was ‘Portraits’ by Skira, a monograph surveying 20 years of celebrity portraits, which was exhibited in London, New York, and Milan.
Weber spent four days in 2012 and 2013 at Goodwood for his second book, Goodwood Revival. Which celebrates the magic of the world's largest historic motor racing and vintage lifestyle event, held at the Goodwood Motor Circuit in South England. The photographs from his book were later exhibited in London, Milan and Lecce and won the Communication Arts for best Photobook in 2015.
Weber's latest book 'The Allure of Horses' published by Assouline in Autumn 2018. This title takes readers on a "unique examination of the close relationship between humans and horses, this title takes readers on a journey across equine communities—from the steeplechase to the Changing of the Guard by the Household Cavalry to the thrill of the polo field to side-saddle riding through the countryside on a warm summer’s eve." 'The Allure of Horses' has been exhibited in London, in the Grande Salle of Maison Assouline.

He received a Hasselblad Masters Award in 2006,

Books

Exhibitions

Solo
 Portraits, The Hospital Club, London 2010
 Portraits, La Rinascente Palermo, Italy 2011
 Portraits, La Rinascente Milan, Italy 2011
 Portraits, Palazzo Vernazza, Lecce, Italy 2012
 Portraits, Ten43 Gallery Gallery, New York City, 2012
 Goodwood Revival, San Babila Location, Milan, Italy 2015
 Goodwood Revival, Museo Storico della Città di Lecce, Italy 2015
 Goodwood Revival, London Sunbeam Studios, 2016
 The Allure of Horses, Maison Assouline, London 2018
 The Allure of Horses, Castello di Carlo V, Lecce, Italy 2019
 The Allure of Horses, Fabbrica Del Vapore, Milano, Italy 2019
 Quid Pluris : Looking Beyond, Palazzo Maresgallo, Lecce, Italy 2021
 Seductions, Palazzo Riso, Palermo, Italy 2022
 Moments, The Ljubljana Castle, Ljubljana, Slovenia 2022

Group
 Kylie Minogue at the Victoria and Albert Museum London, 2007
 Sunday Times Magazine at the Saatchi Gallery, London, 2012
 Viktor and Rolf exhibition at the National Gallery of Victoria, Melbourne, Australia, 2016
 John Rocha at The Calm Photography Movement
 Hackett London & Polo 150 at Christie's London, 2019
 Turin Art week, Photo & Contemporary Art Gallery, Italy 2020 
 MIA Photography, Galleria Paola Colombari, Milan, Italy 2020
 BLOCKS, Albergo delle Povere, Milano, Italy 2021 
 ABGEFAHREN - the car in art at Kuenstlerhaus Marktoberdorf, Germany 2021

References 

1964 births
Living people
Photographers from Baden-Württemberg
People from Ulm
Photographers from London